Luis Liendo (born 18 April 1949) is a Bolivian footballer. He played in three matches for the Bolivia national football team from in 1975. He was also part of Bolivia's squad for the 1975 Copa América tournament.

References

1949 births
Living people
Bolivian footballers
Bolivia international footballers
Place of birth missing (living people)
Association football midfielders
Chaco Petrolero players
The Strongest players